The Isuzu VehiCROSS (UGS250) is a compact SUV from Isuzu. The vehicle also features the Torque on Demand (TOD) 4-wheel-drive system produced by BorgWarner. It is a small, sporty 2-door crossover vehicle with aggressive external styling, including short overhangs, an aggressive forward stance, titanium "teeth" in the grille, a black hood-insert, and black plastic cladding over the entire lower half of the vehicle. The US VehiCROSS came equipped with 16" polished wheels in 1999 and 18" chrome wheels during the remainder of production. The Japanese version came equipped with 16" alloys with chrome center caps.

The VehiCROSS combined a computer-controlled AWD system for on-road driving and a low-gear 4WD system for off-road driving. The Japanese version offered a 2WD non TOD or 4WD TOD option. The US-only constant 4WD TOD, with 12 independent sensors for detecting wheel spin and capable of redirecting power to the wheels with the most traction, gives the VehiCROSS a high level of traction on wet and icy roads.  It also has a high level of performance for its height. While possessing on-road nimbleness, its body-on-frame truck construction, suspension and 4WD gearing make it very capable off-road.

Sales were intentionally limited, with only 5,958 vehicles being produced between 1997 and 2001; 1,805 were produced for the domestic Japanese market and the remaining 4,153 sold in the United States. It appears that Isuzu revisited a limited production approach they used in the mid-1960s with the dramatic 117 Coupe and the later Isuzu Piazza to produce an exclusive two door vehicle. Japanese sales were limited by the fact that the exterior width dimensions were not in compliance with Japanese Government dimension regulations, and the engine displacement obligated Japanese drivers for higher levels of annual road tax. The vehicle had a base price of $28,900.

Manufacture and release 

The VehiCROSS was originally unveiled as a concept vehicle at the 1993 Tokyo International Auto Show. Its ultimate Japanese production release in 1997 was notable in that the production vehicle arrived with very few design changes and in a very short time. This feat was accomplished through the use of inexpensive ceramic body-stamping dies and the reuse of readily-available Isuzu parts. The truck was intended to showcase Isuzu's off-road technology, and is one of the few vehicles to ship with monotube shocks with external heat-expansion chambers, a technology normally reserved for off-road motorcycle racing.

Motor Trend featured the VehiCROSS on its May 1999 cover, and included it in its "Top 10 Sport Utilities" for Most Unique Styling.

Four Wheeler featured the VehiCROSS as the "First Runner Up" for Four Wheeler of the Year in 2000 behind the Tahoe Z71; when pitted against: Chevrolet Tahoe Z71, GMC Yukon, Nissan Xterra, Ford Excursion and Mitsubishi Montero Sport. The VehiCROSS scored highest of all 6 Mechanically, for Trail Performance and Highway Performance.

Both a concept four-door version (VX-4) and a roadster (VX-O2) were shown at the 2000 Los Angeles International Auto Show, but neither reached production. Both of these concepts were donated to the Petersen Automotive Museum in Los Angeles in late 2008. Both were later returned to Isuzu when the Petersen Museum renovated. Isuzu had to destroy the vehicles for legal reasons in 2017.

Design team 
Led by Shiro Nakamura and Satomi Murayama, chief designer/manager at Isuzu's European office in Brussels, the design team was an international group: Simon Cox (assistant chief designer best known for designing the Lotus Elan's interior), Joji Yanaka, Andrew Hill and Nick Robinson. The task was to build a "lightweight but tough, fun but environmentally friendly" SUV.

Winner of the 1999 Russian Spirit of Time Award by the Russian Design Confederation (presented to Isuzu at the 1999 Russian International Motor Show).

In motorsport & awards 
Stage 2 and 4 Class Winner, 1998 Paris–Granada–Dakar Rally
Class Winner 1999 Australian Safari Rally
Winner "Most Unique Styling" Motor Trend 1999 Top 10 Sport/Utes
Used by Austin Robot Technology as foundation for robotic VX in 2005-2007 DARPA Grand Challenge
Motor Trend reports it gets thumbs up for look-at-me-Gen-X Styling and outstanding seats

Production details (US version only)

Production details (Japanese version only)

References 

VehiCROSS
All-wheel-drive vehicles
Compact sport utility vehicles
Cars introduced in 1997
2000s cars